Velkovýroba ctnosti is a Czech novel by Jiří Haussmann. It was first published in 1922.

Satirical novels
1922 Czech novels